The Academy of Arts is a state arts institution in Berlin, Germany. The task of the Academy is to promote art, as well as to advise and support the states of Germany.

The Academy's predecessor organization was founded in 1696 by Elector Frederick III of Brandenburg as the Brandenburg Academy of Arts, an academic institution in which members could meet and discuss and share ideas. The current Academy was founded on 1 October 1993 as the re-unification of formerly separate East and West Berlin academies.

Membership
The Academy is an incorporated body of the public right under the laws of the Federal Republic of Germany.  New members are nominated by secret ballot of the general assembly, and appointed by the president with membership never to exceed 500.

The academy‘s recent presidents include:
 Adolf Muschg – (2003–2006)
 Klaus Staeck – (2006–2015)
 Jeanine Meerapfel – (2015– )

History

Beginning in the 1690s, the Prussian Academy of Arts, under various names, served as an arts council and learned society for the Prussian government. Founded by the Hohenzollern elector Frederick III (King in Prussia from 1701), it was the third-oldest such academy in Europe. The institution was housed on No. 8 Unter den Linden, until from 1902 the site was cleared and rebuilt as seat of the Berlin State Library. The Academy then moved to Pariser Platz next to Hotel Adlon, where the Palais Arnim, former residence of Prime Minister Adolf Heinrich von Arnim-Boitzenburg, was refurbished according to plans designed by Ernst von Ihne.

The Academy also served as a training school since its founding, and created a number of affiliated schools.  The first was the Bauakademie for architectural training, founded in 1799. The academic arm was fully separated in 1931 and developed into the present-day Berlin University of the Arts (Universität der Künste Berlin). In 1938 the academy building was seized by Hitler's chief architect Albert Speer to evolve his Welthauptstadt Germania plans; temporarily relocated to the Kronprinzenpalais, the Prussian Academy ultimately ceased operations in 1945. 

In postwar divided Germany, two parallel organizations took its place. The western successor organization was called the Akademie der Künste, founded in 1954 under President Hans Scharoun, which resided in the rebuilt Hansaviertel quarter of West Berlin. The eastern successor organization was founded on 24 March 1950 as the Deutsche Akademie der Künste in East Berlin which became the Akademie der Künste der DDR in 1972, then the Akademie der Künste zu Berlin in 1990. Its presidents included Arnold Zweig, Ludwig Renn, Johannes R. Becher, Otto Nagel, Willi Bredel, Konrad Wolf, Manfred Wekwerth and Heiner Müller.

These two were merged on 1 October 1993 into the present-day academy, which took its seat in a new building at the former location on Pariser Platz

Awards and honours
Berliner Kunstpreis
Käthe Kollwitz Prize
Heinrich Mann Prize
Konrad Wolf Prize

Alfred Döblin Prize
Joana Maria Gorvin Prize
Will Lammert Prize

References

External links

Akademie der Künste/Academy of Arts official website
Akademie der Künste membership roster 

Arts organizations established in 1993
1993 establishments in Germany
 
Art museums and galleries in Berlin
Arts councils
Academies of arts
Frederick I of Prussia